The Colorado PGA Championship is a golf tournament that is the championship of the Colorado section of the PGA of America. Fred Wampler, PGA Tour winner of the Los Angeles Open in 1954, and Jack Sommers, club pro and member of the Colorado Golf Hall of Fame, share the record for most victories with four. Other PGA Tour winners who have also won this event include Dale Douglass (3-time PGA Tour winner) and Bill Johnston (2-time PGA Tour winner).

Winners 

 2022 Micah Rudosky
 2021 Micah Rudosky
 2020 Geoff Keffer
 2019 Ron Vlosich
 2018 Patrick Reidy
 2017 John Ogden
 2016 Geoff Keffer
 2015 Doug Rohrbaugh
 2014 Doug Rohrbaugh
 2013 Doug Rohrbaugh
 2012 Caine Fitzgerald
 2011 Rob Hunt
 2010 Chris Johnson
 2009 Rob Hunt
 2008 Perry Holmes
 2007 Matt Call
 2006 Mike Northern
 2005 Heikke Nielsen
 2004 Bill Loeffler
 2003 Dale Smigelsky
 2002 Bill Loeffler
 2001 Micah Rudosky
 2000 Bill Loeffler
 1999 Mike Zaremba
 1998 Ken Krieger
 1997 Ken Krieger
 1996 Ken Krieger
 1995 Jack Sommers
 1994 Stacey Hart
 1993 Ron Vlosich
 1992 Ron Vlosich
 1991 Ron Vlosich
 1990 Tom Woodard
 1989 Gregg Jones
 1988 Jack Sommers
 1987 Mike Zaremba
 1986 Scott Hart
 1985 Bob Augustine
 1984 Gregg Jones
 1983 Dale Douglass
 1982 Jack Sommers
 1981 Tim Brauch
 1980 Jack Sommers
 1979 Skip Tredway
 1978 Dow Fitzgerald
 1977 Steve Satterstrom
 1976 Pat Rea
 1975 Rich Bland
 1974 Fred Wampler
 1973 Fred Wampler
 1972 Bill Johnston
 1971 Dow Fitzgerald
 1970 Dow Fitzgerald
 1969 Bob Hold
 1968 Fred Wampler
 1967 Bob Hold
 1966 Fred Wampler
 1965 Tony Novitisky
 1964 J. D. Taylor
 1963 Bob Hold
 1962 No record
 1961 No record
 1960 Bill Bisdorf
 1959 No record
 1958 J. D. Taylor

References

External links 
PGA of America – Colorado section
Past champions

Golf in Colorado
PGA of America sectional tournaments
Recurring sporting events established in 1958
1958 establishments in Colorado